Yeniceköy is a village under de facto control of Northern Cyprus, located 7 km east of Değirmenlik. Even before 1974, the town was almost exclusively inhabited by Turkish Cypriots.

References

Communities in Nicosia District
Populated places in Lefkoşa District